Ochromyscus is a genus of rodent in the family Muridae.

It contains two species from Sub-Saharan Africa and the Arabian Peninsula, both of which were formerly classified in Myomyscus:

 Brockman's rock mouse, Ochromyscus brockmani
 Yemeni mouse, Ochromyscus yemeni

References 

Ochromyscus
Rodent genera